The Mitsubishi Ki-46 was a twin-engine reconnaissance aircraft used by the Imperial Japanese Army in World War II. Its Army Shiki designation was Type 100 Command Reconnaissance Aircraft; the Allied brevity code name was "Dinah".

Development and design
On 12 December 1937, the Imperial Japanese Army Air Force issued a specification to Mitsubishi for a long-range strategic reconnaissance aircraft to replace the Mitsubishi Ki-15. The specification demanded an endurance of six hours and sufficient speed to evade interception by any fighter in existence or development, but otherwise did not constrain the design by a team led by Tomio Kubo (a 1931 graduate from the Aeronautical Section of the Faculty of Engineering at Tokyo Imperial University) whose aesthetics are very significantly infused to the aircraft.

The resulting design was a twin-engined, low-winged monoplane with a retractable tailwheel undercarriage. It had a small diameter oval fuselage which accommodated a crew of two, with the pilot and observer situated in individual cockpits separated by a large fuel tank. Further fuel tanks were situated in the thin wings both inboard and outboard of the engines, giving a total fuel capacity of 1,490 L (328 imperial gallons). The engines, two Mitsubishi Ha-26s, were housed in close fitting cowlings developed by the Aeronautical Research Institute of the Tokyo Imperial University to reduce drag and improve pilot view.

The first prototype aircraft, with the designation Ki-46, flew in November 1939 from the Mitsubishi factory at Kakamigahara, Gifu, north of Nagoya. Tests showed that the Ki-46 was underpowered, and slower than required, only reaching 540 km/h (336 mph) rather than the specified 600 km/h (373 mph). Otherwise, the aircraft tests were successful. As the type was still faster than the Army's latest fighter, the Nakajima Ki-43, as well as the Navy's new A6M2, an initial production batch was ordered as the Army Type 100 Command Reconnaissance Plane Model 1 (Ki-41-I).

To solve the performance problems, Mitsubishi fitted Ha-102 engines, which were Ha-26s fitted with a two-speed supercharger, while increasing fuel capacity and reducing empty weight. This version, designated Ki-46-II, first flew in March 1941. It met the speed requirements of the original specification, and was ordered into full-scale production, with deliveries starting in July.

Although at first the Ki-46 proved almost immune from interception, the Imperial Japanese Army Air Force realised that improved Allied fighters such as the Supermarine Spitfire and P-38 Lightning could challenge this superiority, and in July 1942, it instructed Mitsubishi to produce a further improved version, the Ki-46-III. This had more powerful, fuel-injected Mitsubishi Ha-112 engines, and a redesigned nose, with a fuel tank ahead of the pilot and a new canopy, smoothly faired from the extreme nose of the aircraft, eliminating the "step" of the earlier versions. The single defensive machine gun of the earlier aircraft was also omitted. The new version first flew in December 1942, demonstrating significantly higher speed (630 km/h (391 mph) at 6,000 m (19,700 ft)). The performance of the Ki-46-III even proved superior to that of the aircraft intended to replace it (the Tachikawa Ki-70), which as a result did not enter production.

In an attempt to yet further improve the altitude performance of the Ki-46, two prototypes were fitted with exhaust driven turbosupercharged Ha-112-II-Ru engines. This version first flew in February 1944, but only two prototypes were built.

Mitsubishi factories made a total of 1,742 examples of all versions (34 units Ki-46-I, 1093 units Ki-46-II, 613 units Ki-46-III, 4 units Ki-46-IV）during 1941–44.

Operational history

This aircraft was first used by the Japanese Army in Manchukuo and China, where seven units were equipped with it, and also at times by the Japanese Imperial Navy in certain reconnaissance missions over the northern coasts of Australia and New Guinea.

The Japanese Army used this aircraft for the same type of missions (which were not authorized) over present-day Malaysia during the months before the Pacific War. Later, it was used for high altitude reconnaissance over Burma, Indochina, Thailand, and the Indian Ocean. The Ki-46 was regarded by the British RAF in Burma as a difficult aircraft to counter, only occasionally intercepting them successfully. On September 25, 1944, Flying Officer Wittridge shot down a Ki-46, using a personally modified Spitfire Mk VIII. Wittridge had removed two machine guns and the seat armour, and also polished the wing leading edges to gain extra speed. The leading American fighter pilot Richard Bong, flying a P-38 Lightning, managed to shoot down a Ki-46 over the coast of Papua New Guinea in late 1942.

In 1944–45, during the last days of the war, it was modified as a high-altitude interceptor, with two 20 mm cannons in the nose and one 37 mm (1.46 in) cannon in an "upwards-and-forwards" position – almost like the Luftwaffes Schräge Musik night fighter cannon emplacements – for fighting USAAF B-29 Superfortresses over the metropolitan Japanese islands. It lacked stability for sustained shooting of the 37 mm (1.46 in) weapon, had only a thin layer of armour plating, lacked self-sealing fuel tanks, and was slow to climb.

The Ki-46 was also assigned to two whole Sentai (wings/groups), as well as individual Chutaicho (junior operational commanders) in the Imperial Japanese Army Air Service, during the Pacific War.

The Allies captured some examples during the conflict, which were then repaired and flown for evaluation purposes. The Ki-46 III was the only Japanese aircraft type sent to the NII VVS Soviet Air Force Test Institute, for evaluation during 1946–7.

Variants
(note:- The Shiki designations must be used in full, as written below, because the Type number only refers to the year of the designs inception.)
 Army Type 100 Command Reconnaissance Plane The Shiki designation for the Ki-46 Command Reconnaissance Plane
 Army Type 100 Air Defence FighterThe Shiki designation for the Ki-46 Interceptor Fighter
 Army Type 100 Assault PlaneThe Shiki designation for the Ki-46 Assault Plane
 Ki-46 Prototype.
 Ki-46 I Reconnaissance version of the Ki-46.
 Ki-46 II The first operational model of the series.
 Ki-46 II KAI Three-seat training version of the Ki-46. Used for radio and navigation training, with a redesigned cabin, dorsal en echelon extension. Conversions of the Ki-46 II.
 Ki-46 III "Traditional" stepped windshield replaced with a smooth, curved, glazed panel extended over the pilot's seat giving a more aerodynamic nose profile. Engine power increased to 1,500 hp (Ha-112-II), extra fuel tank added in the nose.
 Ki-46 III-KAI Defense interceptor/night fighter version of the Ki-46. Equipped with two 20 mm cannon in the nose and one 37 mm (1.46 in) cannon in the "Schräge Musik"-style upwards-aimed dorsal frontal position.
 Ki-46 III Land strike version of the Ki-46, without 37 mm (1.46 in) cannon armament.
 Ki-46 IIIb Ground-attack version.
 Ki-46 IIIc Unbuilt design project.
 Ki-46 IV Prototype, equipped with two turbocharged 1,119 kW (1,500 hp) Mitsubishi Ha-112-IIru engines, and more fuel capacity.
 Ki-46 IVa/b Series models of reconnaissance/fighter aircraft, unbuilt design projects

Operators

French Air Force – Captured aircraft.

Imperial Japanese Army Air Force
Imperial Japanese Navy Air Service

Chinese Communist Air Force Two captured Ki-46s in communist Chinese hands served as a ground-attack aircraft and a trainer respectively, and the last Ki-46 retired in the early 1950s.

Surviving aircraft

The only known survivor is a Ki-46-III Army Type 100 example, currently on display at Royal Air Force Museum Cosford, in England. It was captured in Malaya and became part of the RAF St Athan collection of historic aircraft, before passing to the RAF Museum at RAF Cosford where it is on public display. It is now on display at the RAF Museum Hendon

Specifications (Ki-46-II)

See also

Notes

Bibliography
 
 .
 .

External links

 Vectorsite article

Ki-46, Mitsubishi
World War II Japanese reconnaissance aircraft
Ki-046
Low-wing aircraft
Aircraft first flown in 1939
Twin piston-engined tractor aircraft